Arenella is a quarter of Naples, southern Italy. It is on the Vomero hill above the city and was, 300 meters in elevation. Many years ago was considered a place to go to "get away from it all". It is near to the main hospital section of the city, set somewhat higher, on the way up to the Hermitage of Camaldoli. It has some points of historic interest, such as the presence of the workshop of Giambattista della Porta.

Etimology 

According to some sources, the origin of its name is probably to be linked to the fact that one of the ancient cores of this area, Piazzetta Arenella, near the modern Piazza Muzij, looked and still looks like a small arena, where in the past they held the most important meetings, markets and civil and religious events.

According to the canon Carlo Celano the denomination (in common with that of Arenaccia), is due to the sandy debris coming from the Camaldoli hill transported by rainwater.

In particular, before the 20th century in the hilly area of the city, then made up mostly of agricultural areas, the clearings present in the area were never or almost never called with the term of square or small square, but with the name of "largo" (such as for example largo Antignano, still existing) or "arena", whose district deformations are precisely those of Arenella and Arenaccia.

Infrastructure and transport

Bibliography 

 Mimmo Piscopo, Vomero e dintorni: viaggio nella memoria di un vomerese accanito, Naples, Guida Editori, 2000, .
 Antonio La Gala, Vomero. Storia e storie, Naples, Guida Editori, 2004, .
 Vincenzo Vinciguerra, Dall’autenticità alla “McDonaldizzazione” di Napoli: Confronto tra storia e modernità di due realtà partenopee, PM edizioni, 2017, .

References 

Quartieri of Naples